The 2018–19 Incarnate Word Cardinals men's basketball team represent the University of the Incarnate Word during the 2018–19 NCAA Division I men's basketball season. The Cardinals are led by 1st-year head coach Carson Cunningham and play their home games at McDermott Convocation Center in San Antonio, Texas as members of the Southland Conference.

Previous season
The Cardinals finished the 2017–18 season 7–21, 2–16 in Southland play to finish in a tie for 11th place. They failed to qualify for the Southland tournament.

The season marked the Cardinals' first full season as a Division I school after a four-year transition period from Division II to Division I and were thus eligible for postseason play.

Roster

Schedule and results
Sources:

|-
!colspan=9 style=| Non-conference regular season

|-
!colspan=9 style=| Southland regular season

See also
 2018–19 Incarnate Word Cardinals women's basketball team

References

Incarnate Word Cardinals men's basketball seasons
Incarnate Word
Incarnate Word Cardinals men's basketball
Incarnate Word Cardinals men's basketball